Destiny USA (stylized as destiny usa and also known by its former name Carousel Center) is a six-story, automobile-oriented super-regional shopping, dining, and entertainment complex on the shore of Onondaga Lake in the city of Syracuse, New York. It is the largest shopping mall in the state of New York and the 9th largest in the country. In 2021, Destiny USA was included among the top 20 most visited shopping centers in America, attracting over 26 million visitors a year. The mall currently features Macy's, At Home, Dick's Sporting Goods, Burlington Coat Factory,DSW, Old Navy, Nordstrom Rack, and TJ Maxx.

Destiny USA opened on October 15, 1990 as Carousel Center. The mall has six above-ground floors and one underground floor. The lower three floors and the underground floor are used for retail shops. The first and second floors span the length of the mall and house the various shops, vendors, restaurants, and entertainment venues, with the major food court and namesake carousel located on the second floor. The third floor includes a 19-screen Regal Cinemas, restaurants, and entertainment options. The fourth floor is primarily administrative offices. The underground floor, known as the Commons floor, houses medium-sized stores, a chapel, kiosks, and two underground parking garages. The Commons floor does not span the full length of the mall and is in only the original mall structure built in 1990.

Destiny USA has outside parking surrounding the mall on nearly all sides. On the Hiawatha Boulevard side, additional parking lots are located across the street from the mall and a pedestrian bridge was built to connect the parking lot to the second floor of the 2012 addition. Parking includes one above-ground and two underground parking garages. The mall is served by CENTRO buses.  There are main entrances on nearly all sides of the mall. Other entrances are located through the anchor stores and from the underground parking lots.

History

Background and construction
The site of Destiny USA was originally a landfill named Marley Scrap Yard, surrounded by several square blocks of oil tanks, collectively named "Oil City". South of these oil tanks sat the Franklin Square industrial neighborhood. In 1987, The Pyramid Companies studied redevelopment of the neighborhood. In July 1987, The Pyramid Companies announced plans for a  shopping center at the scrap yard site. The plan caused controversy with other local shopping centers and malls. The Galleries of Syracuse, a smaller mall (now offices) had recently finished construction in Downtown Syracuse and there was concern that the mall at Oil City would put an end to downtown retail.

Two of the biggest opponents to the project were the competing mall developers in the area, Wilmorite Corp. and Eagan Real Estate Inc, which both operated several malls in Syracuse's suburbs. Wilmorite, which was building the Great Northern Mall in the nearby town of Clay, was accused by the Syracuse city government of using associates in Connecticut to form the "Citizen's League for an Environmentally Acceptable Northeast," which lobbied against construction of the Carousel Center mall at Oil City. Eagan meanwhile filed criticism of the mall, claiming that a 25-percent drop in downtown retail sales would occur if the mall were built. It proposed an additional downtown mall with a "Walt Disney-like attraction."

During construction the mall faced several delays, primarily around environmental cleanup, as the site is a brownfield cleanup site. The mall opened on October 15, 1990, as Carousel Center, named for the 1908 Philadelphia Toboggan Coasters (PTC) carousel, PTC #18 operating within the mall.

1990s
When it opened, Carousel Center featured a range of upscale and popular chains. Anchors included Bonwit Teller, Kaufmann's, Chappell's, Steinbach, JCPenney, Lechmere, and Hills. A basement "Commons" area featured covered parking and additional junior anchors, including The Rx Place and Filene's Basement.

Another unique feature of the mall was the Skydeck, which was on the top levels of the central tower. This offered an events space that would be used for fundraisers, proms, fashion shows, and many public and private uses.

In 1990, The Pyramid Companies began clearing oil tanks south of the mall for a strip center called Carousel Landing, which would feature 650,000 square feet of additional retail.

In 1992, Chappell's became The Bon Ton because of a merger with the parent company.

An additional anchor space was built for Lord & Taylor in 1994.

By 1995, Carousel Landing was still not built because of potential environmental impact. By 1996, The Pyramid Companies finally got approval to condemn the oil tanks.

In 1996, Steinbach was replaced with Home Place, a Northeast-based upscale home furnishings store. Nobody Beats the Wiz also opened in 1996 in the Commons level.

In November 1997, less than a month after Lechmere closed (a result of parent company Montgomery Ward eliminating the chain), the Pyramid Companies announced they would build an expansion to Carousel Center that would double the mall size instead of building Carousel Landing. Under this plan, the expansion would house about 150 new stores and three anchors, with many of the stores both new to the market. The Pyramid Companies officials claimed the expansion would be complete by the year 2000.

In 1998, CompUSA store and a Kahunaville restaurant opened in the Commons Level and Best Buy opened in part of the former HomePlace/Steinbach location.

In 1999, Hills was acquired and rebranded by Ames Department Stores. In March 1999, DSW Shoe Warehouse opened in part of the former Lechmere. In October 1999, Bally Total Fitness opened with a grand opening featuring the cast of Baywatch. The Bally Total Fitness filled in the remaining part of HomePlace/Steinbach location that wasn't occupied by Best Buy.

2000s and potential expansions
In March 2000, Bonwit Teller shuttered their location at the mall while the chain filed for bankruptcy. The space was taken that year by one of the first American outposts for H&M. It was also the first mall location. In May of that year, Kaufmann's Furniture Galleries opened in the mall.

In 2001, The Pyramid Companies announced an expansion project that instead of doubling the size of the mall would triple the size of the mall. The new project proposed to rename the mall from Carousel Center to "Destiny USA". The Skydeck was closed for new administrative offices for the complex. There would also be a large Central New York Visitors Center inside the mall. However, the path to Destiny USA would not be easy. The Pyramid Companies needed public funds and tax breaks to make the project possible and people worried the mall would be obsolete before all of it was paid. Eventually it was decided the mall would be developed in phases, with an 800,000 square foot addition built first. Despite this, The Pyramid Companies continued to unveil further plans for Destiny USA. Eventually, the large tax breaks and the magnitude of the project would cause much controversy.

In 2004, DSW moved down into the Commons Level while Circuit City took its place. Circuit City previously operated a pocket store in the mall before initially closing. Circuit City would later close in 2009, after the company failed to find a buyer for itself.

In August 2005, Sports Authority moved in as a new anchor store.

In September 2006, Kaufmann's became Macy's.

In 2007, The Pyramid Companies proposed the first phase of Destiny USA: a new addition that would add  to Carousel Center. This would make Destiny USA the largest mall in New York and the 6th largest in the country.  The project was planned to be a green building, powered entirely by renewable resources.

In late 2009, it was announced that Destiny USA would use RFID technology but required tenants to turn over profits to Pyramid.

2010s: Expansion and name change
In May 2011, an agreement between Citigroup and The Pyramid Companies was finalized and the addition continued. Destiny USA was set to feature a retail mix featuring entertainment, luxury, and outlet stores. Documents from the trial showed several stores leased in the new expansion. In June 2011, the Syracuse Post-Standard asked people to email the newspaper ideas of what people would like to see in Destiny USA, with Destiny officials listening in. Residents listed several ideas, including entertainment venues like Dave & Buster's, and upscale restaurants like P.F. Changs, but nothing was officially announced.

In November 2011, Destiny USA became the largest mall in New York and the 6th largest in the country. Parts of the new addition opened, mostly featuring temporary holiday stores and signs showing what's yet to come.

By late summer of 2012, the CarouselCenter.com webpage merged in with the DestinyUSA.com webpage, as new signage went up. In August 2012, the mall's name officially changed to "Destiny USA", ending all references to Carousel Center. New major stores in the mall included Burlington Coat Factory in the Commons level, Dick's Sporting Goods, and a P.F. Chang's restaurant also opened. New amusement activities opened including WonderWorks, Dave and Buster's, Billy Beez Indoor Play Park, APEX Entertainment, a bowling and restaurant venue with a bar and dance area, RPM Raceway Indoor Karting, and Canyon Climb, the world's largest indoor rope course.

On June 14, 2013, Regal Cinemas opened their IMAX & RPX screens featuring Man of Steel in 3D. The IMAX & RPX also feature a separate entrance and concession stand.

On January 4, 2015 it was announced via the Destiny USA website that Nordstrom Rack would be opening. The 33,357-square-foot store opened in fall of 2015. The store is located on the first level. 

In October 2016, At Home opened as a new anchor, replacing Sports Authority, who closed as a result of the company’s bankruptcy.

A $48 million, seven story, 209-room Embassy Suites hotel opened at the Destiny complex in September 2017.

On October 9, 2019, A new LEGO store opened.

2020s
On August 27, 2020, Lord & Taylor announced they would shutter their brick-and-mortar fleet after modernizing into a digital collective department store.

In 2021, A new Regal Cinemas 4DX theater was announced, along with renovations to the theaters. An indoor trampoline park called Get Air was also announced.

An upstate New York mall manager said "Retailers were hesitant to sign deals during the pandemic, but as business is beginning to return to normal, leasing activity is picking up".

By 2022, the mall had seen an uptick in growth of tenants. New stores included  Anthropologie, Ardene, Armani, ‘Cuse Ink, Earthbound Trading Co, Hugo Boss, Offline by Aerie, Hobby Lobby, Untuckit, and Urban Outfitters.

See also
 Onondaga Creekwalk
 Onondaga Lake
 Inner Harbor, Syracuse

References

External links
 
 Destiny USA Google+ Local Page
 

The Pyramid Companies
Shopping malls in New York (state)
Buildings and structures under construction in the United States
Buildings and structures in Syracuse, New York
Culture of Syracuse, New York
Tourist attractions in Syracuse, New York
Shopping malls established in 1990
Onondaga Lake
Economy of Syracuse, New York